Alberto Edjogo-Owono Montalbán (born 21 April 1984), known simply as Alberto, is an Equatoguinean retired footballer who played as a forward.

Club career
Born in Sabadell, Barcelona, Spain to an Equatoguinean father and a Spanish mother, Alberto emerged through local CE Sabadell FC's youth system, making his senior debut in 2003 with the club in Segunda División B. Released two years later, he resumed his career in amateur football mainly in his native region, only returning to the third level in the 2006–07 season and appearing rarely for UE Sant Andreu (one fourth of the matches played, team relegation).

Subsequently, Alberto returned to the regional championships, representing successively Pinatar CF, CD Olímpic de Xàtiva, Mazarrón CF, CD Blanes, UD Vista Alegre, FC Vilafranca and UA Horta.

International career
Alberto made his Equatorial Guinea national team debut on 6 July 2003, in an 2004 Africa Cup of Nations qualifying match against Morocco in Bata, a 0–1 home loss.

Personal life
Alberto's older brother, Juvenal, was also a footballer. A midfielder, he also represented Sabadell.

References

External links

Stats at Jugadores Perdidos 

1984 births
Living people
Citizens of Equatorial Guinea through descent
Equatoguinean sportspeople of Spanish descent
Spanish sportspeople of Equatoguinean descent
Sportspeople from Sabadell
Equatoguinean footballers
Spanish footballers
Footballers from Catalonia
Association football forwards
Segunda División B players
Tercera División players
Divisiones Regionales de Fútbol players
CE Sabadell FC footballers
CF Peralada players
UE Sant Andreu footballers
CD Olímpic de Xàtiva footballers
UA Horta players
Equatorial Guinea international footballers